Nicholas Balkema (7 April 1865 – 29 January 1954) was an American politician.

Balkema was of Dutch descent. He was born on 7 April 1865 in Gibbsville, Wisconsin, attended Sheboygan Falls High School, then moved to Newkirk, Iowa, in 1884. On 9 December 1886, he married a Newkirk native, Clara Van Rooyen, with whom he raised four daughters and three sons. He became a schoolteacher, and later ran his own business, as well as the post office. In 1894, Balkema moved to Sioux Center. He held local offices and executive positions for a time before pursuing statewide political office. These included service as a bank executive, school board member, and city councilor in Sioux Center. Between 1909 and 1921, Balkema represented District 49, which included Sioux County, in the Iowa Senate as a Republican. He died on 29 January 1954, aged 88.

References

1865 births
1954 deaths
20th-century American politicians
19th-century American businesspeople
20th-century American businesspeople
Iowa postmasters
People from Sioux Center, Iowa
People from Lima, Sheboygan County, Wisconsin
Republican Party Iowa state senators
American bankers
19th-century American educators
Schoolteachers from Iowa
School board members in Iowa
Iowa city council members
American people of Dutch descent